Yarok Island is a coastal island in the Laptev Sea, a marginal sea of the Arctic Ocean. The island is located off the mouths of the Chondon, east of the Yana river.

Administratively, Yarok Island is part of Ust-Yansky District, Sakha Republic (Yakutia), Russia.

Geography
Yarok Island is large and flat. It has many small lakes, swamps and sandbars.

The Chondon bay, the coastal area off which Yarok Island lies, is an extensive wetland zone. It is subject to severe Arctic weather with frequent gales and blizzards. Further north, the sea in the Yana Bay is frozen with thick ice for about eight months every year, so that Yarok is merged with the mainland.

History
In 1712, Yakov Permyakov and his companion Merkury Vagin, the first recorded Russian explorers of the area, crossed the Yana Bay from the mouth of the Yana River to Bolshoy Lyakhovsky Island over the ice and explored the then unknown island. Unfortunately Permyakov and Vagin were killed on the way back from their exploration by mutineering expedition members.

In 1892–1894, Baron Eduard Toll, accompanied by expedition leader Alexander Bunge, carried out geological surveys in the Yana delta area on behalf of the Russian Imperial Academy of Sciences located in St. Petersburg.

References

External links
Isotope geochemistry of laptev sea surface sediments

Islands of the Laptev Sea
Islands of the Sakha Republic
Chondon basin